Thaala is a 2019 Sri Lankan Sinhalese musical drama film directed by Paalitha Perera and produced by Nilan Weerasinghe for MEntertainment production as a Sirasa Movie. It stars Hemal Ranasinghe and Kalani Dodantenna in lead roles along with Jayalath Manoratne and Kaushalya Fernando. Music composed by Chinthaka Jayakody. It is the 1322nd Sri Lankan film in the Sinhala cinema.

Plot
The children of two villages come to the Hatangala school situated in the middle of a large forest, a rock and a tank. This is a very rural school. There is a shortage of teachers in the school due to the difficulties. The Principal Hewanayake (Manoratne) and the Amaravathi teacher (Kaushalya), who are about to retire, are trying unsuccessfully to keep the children who are leaving the school day by day. Local politician (Chamila), think to take this advantage of the lack of children in the school, and are trying to close the school with Osukula (Priyantha), a school teacher and a group of villagers who believe they is a hidden treasure in a nearby rock. The principal Hewanayake and Amaravathi teacher, who are opposed to this, are trying unsuccessfully to run the school. At this moment a young teacher named Asela (Hemal) comes to school. Asela's parents are middle class public servants.

Asela holds a Bachelor's Degree in English from the University of Colombo and has a strong opinion on the current education system in Sri Lanka and the awareness of education among parents and children. Asela is having frequent conversations with his university friend and decides to become a teacher. He selects the Hattongala school as his first teaching school. Asela uses games and music they love are used for educational and teaching activities, allowing children to learn. In a short period of time, he is able to create a new educational awakening in the school with attractive, teaching methods. Children learn eagerly. There is an increase in the number of children attending school every day.

As the aims of local politicians are undermined, they begin to oppose the teacher.  In the meantime, Asela makes alternative music and creates a band with local products. During the practises, one child drowned in a tank and escapes. Villagers and Osukula blame Asela for his radical behavior. But as a political revenge, Asela is suddenly transferred from school. Asela and the professor have been assigned a relative of a chief minister and send her as a new teacher to the Hatangala school. Arundathi (Kalani) also starts to continue Asela's work and send the band to All-Island competition. After winning the competition, they went to see old teacher Asela to his home.

Cast
 Hemal Ranasinghe as Asela Danturebandara
 Kalani Dodantenna as Arundathi Esmeralda Divithotawila
 Jayalath Manoratne as Principal, Mr. Hewanayake	
 Kaushalya Fernando as Amaravathi	
 Chandani Seneviratne		
 Priyantha Sirikumara as Osukula
 Wilson Gunaratne as Secretary Senaratne 		
 Giriraj Kaushalya as Kattadiya 		
 Chamila Peiris as local politician
 Wageesha Salgadu
 Danushka Dias
 Pradeep Ramawickrama as Baasu 
 Nimash Dulantha as Roshan
 Nadeeshani Peliarachchi as Nisansala
 Priyanka Samaraweera
 Ruwan Madanayake

Soundtrack
1st single of the soundtrack; 'Moda Band' written by Asoka Handagama was released under M Entertainments label on 9 January 2019. The soundtrack was composed by Chinthaka Jayakody. The album consists of six tracks and was received positively.

References

External links
 
 Thaala on YouTube
 Thaala on Facebook

2019 films
2010s Sinhala-language films